Oswald Cobblepot, also known as the Penguin, is a fictional character in the 1992 film Batman Returns, directed by Tim Burton. Portrayed by Danny DeVito, the character is adapted from the comic book supervillain of the same name. To match the darker tone of the film, this depiction of the Penguin is as a "freak of nature", with webbed, flipper-like fingers, a hooked, beak-like nose, and a penguin-like body, and was raised by penguins in Gotham City's condemned zoo after being abandoned by his wealthy parents as a baby. When he resurfaces years later as an adult, he tries to become a hero in the public's eyes and run for mayor, while secretly plotting to kill all of Gotham's firstborn sons.

The drastic shift in the Penguin's characterization from an elegant crime boss to a psychopathic politician with an animal-like appearance was met with mixed reactions from fans and critics, but DeVito's portrayal was largely praised. This version of the Penguin inspired the character's depiction in other works, such as Batman: The Animated Series and The Batman, mostly in the terms of appearance.

Character arc
When Oswald is born, his wealthy parents Tucker and Esther Cobblepot (Paul Reubens and Diane Salinger) are horrified at his deformity, as are the doctor and nurse supervising the birth. Even though they keep him locked in a cage, he is still able to pull the family cat in through the bars and kill it. Tucker and Esther place Oswald in a baby carriage, strap it shut, and throw it into a river in the hope of drowning him. The carriage drifts into the city sewers and comes to rest beneath an abandoned zoo; Oswald survives and is raised by a flock of penguins who have made their home there. As a boy, he becomes a traveling performer in the freak show of the Red Triangle Circus Gang.

Over 33 years after his abandonment, he resurfaces to run for mayor of Gotham City with the help of corrupt businessman Max Shreck (Christopher Walken) and the Red Triangle Gang, of which he is now the leader. He also attempts to discredit Batman (Michael Keaton) in two different ways, first by teaming up with Catwoman (Michelle Pfeiffer) to frame him for murder, then later by taking control of his Batmobile to make him appear to be a menace to the population. 

When the mayoral campaign and frame-ups fall apart, Oswald puts a secret plan into action to kidnap and kill the first-born sons of Gotham's elite as a means of revenge against his parents. After Batman foils this plan, Oswald equips his army of penguins with rockets and sends them into the city, intent on killing as many people as possible. Batman and his butler, Alfred Pennyworth, divert the penguins to attack Oswald's lair instead; he falls into an underground lake of toxic sewage, sustaining fatal injuries. The penguins give him a makeshift funeral, pushing his body back into the water.

Background
After the success of Batman, Tim Burton agreed to direct the sequel for Warner Bros. on the condition that he would be granted total control. The result was Batman Returns, which featured Michael Keaton returning as Batman, and a new triad of villains: Danny DeVito (as the Penguin), Michelle Pfeiffer (as Catwoman) and Christopher Walken (as Max Shreck, an evil corporate tycoon and original character created for the film).

Danny DeVito was suggested for the role by his friend Jack Nicholson after the financial success of the first film, in which Nicholson played the Joker. According to DeVito, "It was four-and-a-half hours of makeup and getting into the costume. We got it down to three hours by the end of the shoot". Dustin Hoffman was originally the first choice to play the Penguin, but he declined. Apart from Hoffman, Marlon Brando, John Candy, Bob Hoskins, Rowan Atkinson, Ralph Waite, Dean Martin, Dudley Moore, Alan Rickman, John Goodman, Phil Collins, Charles Grodin, Christopher Lee, Joe Pesci, Ray Liotta, Gabriel Byrne, Alex Rocco and Christopher Lloyd were all considered for the part before DeVito got it.

Sam Hamm originally wrote a sequel script to the original Batman, which had Catwoman teaming up with the Penguin to go after hidden treasure, but screenwriter Daniel Waters reworked her characterization after Burton brought him in to pen a new screenplay for the film.

Director Tim Burton hired Wesley Strick to do an uncredited rewrite. Strick recalled, "When I was hired to write Batman Returns (Batman II at the time), the big problem of the script was the Penguin's lack of a 'master plan'." Warner Bros. presented Strick with warming, or freezing Gotham City, a plot point they would later use in Batman & Robin. Strick gained inspiration from a Moses parallel that had the Penguin killing the firstborn sons of Gotham. A similar notion was used when the Penguin's parents threw him into a river as a baby.

While this Penguin retained many trademarks, such as a variety of trick umbrellas and the use of a monocle, he was given a dramatic visual makeover. Where the comic version varies between a balding head of short cropped hair and varying degrees of thinning, this Penguin is still bald at the top but with his remaining length of hair long and stringy. His hands are flippers with a thumb and index finger, and the remaining three fingers fused together. An unidentified thick, dark green bile-like liquid sometimes trickles from his nose and mouth. Instead of a tuxedo, he wears a more gothic, Victorian-style outfit with a jabot as opposed to a bow tie. In certain scenes, he also wears black boots, a dickey, and a union suit. However, Burton's design maintained the top hat seen in the comics along with a monocle and a cigarette in some scenes. He also has penguin-like appetites, as shown in a scene where he devours a raw fish, and uses a vehicle shaped like a giant rubber duck to move around the sewers and the city.

Tim Burton, inspired by the film The Cabinet of Dr. Caligari, re-imagined the character not as an eloquent gentleman of crime, but a deformed, psychopathic, crude and infanticidal killer who holds a homicidal grudge against the aristocrats of Gotham City.

For the Japanese-dubbed versions of the film, the Penguin was respectively voiced by Ben Hiura, Tarō Ishida, and Takayuki Sugō in the home media, TV Asahi, and WOWOW editions, while Giorgio Lopez provided the Italian language voice of the Penguin and Uday Sabnis provided the Hindi voice.

Reception
Darker and considerably more personal than its predecessor, concerns were raised that the film was too scary for children. Audiences were more uncomfortable at the film's overt sexuality, personified by the sleek, fetish-inspired styling of Catwoman's costume. Burton made many changes to the Penguin which would subsequently be applied to the character in both comics and television. While in the comics, he was an ordinary man, Burton created a freak of nature resembling a penguin with webbed, flipper-like fingers, a hooked, beak-like nose, and a penguin-like body (resulting in a rotund, obese man). Released in 1992, Batman Returns grossed $282.8 million worldwide, making it a financial success, though not to the extent of its predecessor.

Janet Maslin in The New York Times described Danny DeVito as "conveying verve". Peter Travers in Rolling Stone wrote that Danny DeVito's mutant Penguin—a balloon-bellied Richard III with a kingdom of sewer freaks—is as hilariously warped as Jack Nicholson's Joker and even quicker with the quips." Desson Howe in The Washington Post wrote that The Penguin holds court in a penguin-crowded, Phantom of the Opera-like sewer home. He also described DeVito as "exquisite".

Roger Ebert of the Chicago Sun-Times compared the Penguin negatively with the Joker of the first film, writing that "the Penguin is a curiously meager and depressing creature; I pitied him, but did not fear him or find him funny. The genius of Danny DeVito is all but swallowed up in the paraphernalia of the role." Jonathan Rosenbaum called DeVito "a pale substitute for Jack Nicholson from the first film" and felt that "there's no suspense in Batman Returns whatsoever".

Legacy
The Penguin appears as a recurring foe in Batman: The Animated Series, voiced by Academy Award-winner Paul Williams. This version of the character features the Batman Returns version's physical deformities, such as flippers, a beak-like nose and an obvious hunch, and is shown to possess a rubber duck boat in two episodes, but he retains the traditional refined mannerisms and personality of his comics counterpart, although he still refers to himself as a "bird". His most prominent appearances include the episodes "I've Got Batman in My Basement", "The Strange Secret of Bruce Wayne", "Almost Got 'Im", "The Mechanic", "Birds of a Feather", "Blind as a Bat", and "Second Chance". He is the only villain in the series, other than the Joker, not to be given an origin story. In the sequel series, The New Batman Adventures, his design is revamped to resemble his comics counterpart.

When Batman Returns hit theaters in 1992, Kenner renamed their movie line from Batman II to Batman Returns. This new line included several versions of the same Batman figure sculpt as seen in the previous Dark Knight Collection line. Catwoman and Penguin, received their own figures. Catwoman received a new sculpt, but the Penguin figure was a repainted sculpt from Kenner's Super Powers line.

The character appeared in The Batman, voiced by Tom Kenny. In this continuity, the Penguin is primarily concerned with re-establishing the Cobblepot family name in society by stealing from the citizens of Gotham to rebuild his wealth. While he shares the comic incarnation's love for birds and aristocratic look, this Penguin retained a deformed appearance more similar to the Batman Returns incarnation, but with orange hair (similar to the crests on a rockhopper penguin) instead of black and balding, and sharp, pointy teeth, and fused fingers.

The Batman Returns incarnation of the Penguin makes a cameo appearance in Space Jam: A New Legacy alongside the Batman version of the Joker and the Batman & Robin version of Mr. Freeze as spectators in the basketball match between the Tune Squad and the Goon Squad. Penguin was seen in the same section as his counterpart from the 1960s TV series and The Mask.

In The Lego Batman Movie, Oswald Cobblepot in his Batman Returns design appears as a minor antagonist. This version has pale skin, sharp teeth, and the obesity of his Batman Returns counterpart.

In 2022, The Penguin was portrayed by Colin Farrell in The Batman, released nearly 30 years after the release of Returns. DeVito gave Farrell his blessing for his role.

See also
Selina Kyle (1989 film series character)
Bruce Wayne (1989 film series character)
Cultural depictions of penguins
Penguin in other media
Oswald Cobblepot (Gotham)

References

External links

Tim Burton's Original Batman Returns Had A Weird Penguin & Catwoman Team-Up
Batman Returns: The Actors Who Almost Played The Penguin
CREATING PENGUIN’S PROSTHETICS FOR ‘BATMAN RETURNS’
BATMAN RETURNS - CREATING THE PENGUIN'S ARMY OF PENGUINS
Why Batman Returns’ Danny DeVito Thinks Colin Farrell Will Be ‘Great’ As The Penguin In The Batman
Danny DeVito was eating WHAT in Batman Returns?
A monkey attacked Danny DeVito on the 'Batman Returns' set
'BATMAN RETURNS' ACTOR DANNY DEVITO REFLECTS ON TIM BURTON AND THE BENEFITS OF BEING THE PENGUIN
Danny DeVito Wants To Reprise His Role As Penguin In A Future Batman Film

Characters created by Tim Burton
Film characters introduced in 1992
Batman live-action film characters
Batman (1989 film series)
Fictional murderers
Male film villains
Orphan characters in film
Fictional gangsters
Fictional politicians
Fictional crime bosses
Action film villains
Film supervillains